Toronto FC Academy, also known as TFC Academy, is the youth academy and development system of Canadian Major League Soccer club Toronto FC.

The academy has divisions from U14 to U19 and includes over 110 young players. The senior academy team is known as Toronto FC III.

History
The TFC Academy's U-18 squad began playing in the Canadian Soccer League in 2008, with the U-16 squad competing in the CSL Reserve Division as TFC Academy II.

On August 26, 2010 Doneil Henry signed a pro contract with the Toronto FC senior squad becoming the first-ever TFC academy player to sign since the creation of the club in 2007. Three weeks following the Henry signing Toronto's first team signed forward Nicholas Lindsay becoming the second academy signing in history.  In late September 2011, former defender Ashtone Morgan became the first graduate of the Toronto FC Academy to be called up to the Canadian men's national team.  In 2011 there were close to 50 players enrolled in the TFC Academy.

On January 24, 2011, Stuart Neely the academy director announced that Toronto FC ownership approved a $17.6 million investment in a new training facility and planning was underway for the creation of a third academy team.

After the CSA de-sanctioned the CSL, TFC Academy withdrew from CSL prior to the 2013 season.  The senior academy team joined the Ontario Soccer League for the 2013 season, however in 2014 the under-20 squad (known as Toronto FC III) began competing in League1 Ontario (L1O), which is the third level of the Canadian soccer pyramid.  The academy also fielded a team in the Premier Development League in the 2015–16 seasons before withdrawing.

On June 27, 2013 Canada announced its 23-man squad for the upcoming 2013 CONCACAF Gold Cup, the squad included Ashtone Morgan and Doneil Henry which was the first time TFC academy graduates had made a senior international tournament roster.

In November 2014, Toronto FC announced the establishment of their own team to play in the minor professional USL Pro, which serves as a reserve team for TFC and a bridge between the Academy. Toronto FC became the sixth MLS club to own a USL Pro team. The team, which was named Toronto FC II, began play in 2015 at the Ontario Soccer Centre in Vaughan, just north of Toronto. The new facilities include a permanent seating area with room for expansion and a new artificial playing surface.

In September 2018, the U20 team left L1O and transformed into a U19 team that competes in the U.S. Soccer Development Academy (USSDA), along with U17 and U15 teams.  The U16 and U14 teams will play in the Ontario Player Development League.

The USSA announced on April 15, 2020 that they were ceasing operations permanently due to financial struggles brought on by the COVID-19 pandemic.  In response, MLS announced that it was creating MLS Next as a replacement elite youth player development development platform, which Toronto FC would participate in.

BMO Training Ground

In April 2011, Toronto FC unveiled plans to develop a state-of-art facility and soccer program that looked to develop the next generation of Canadian players through coaching, training, technology, equipment and support. Construction began in May 2011 and in June 2012, TFC academy moved to their new BMO Training Ground on 14 acres of land in Downsview Park, located in North York. Built at a cost of $21 million to MLSE, the facility has 4 pitches in total: four full-sized grass pitches (two heated) and 1 artificial turf pitches (1 capable of being bubbled for year-round use). The 36,000 square foot facility also contains first team facilities (dressing room, hot tub, ice bath, rehabilitation pool, physiotherapy room, private dining) seven dressing rooms for the Academy teams, gym, physio and rehab facilities (separate from first team), kitchen, cafeteria, media room, classroom and offices for coaching staff.

Current technical staff

Head coaches (U19)
  Nick Dasovic (2008–2010)
  Michael Stefano (2014-2015)
  Stuart Neely (2015–2016)
  Danny Dichio (2016–2020) 
  Michael Stefano (2020–2021)
  Dino Lopez (2021–present)

Year-by-year (U19/U20)
The Senior Academy side, commonly known as Toronto FC III, has played at the semi-professional (Division III) level. The team currently is a U19 team, after having previously been a U20 team

Academy graduates
The following players have joined the Toronto FC first team on homegrown player contracts after having previously been a Toronto FC Academy player (players in bold are currently part of the team) (as of September 13, 2022):

 Ayo Akinola (2000) 
 Themi Antonoglou (2001)
 Manny Aparicio (1995) 
 Molham Babouli (1993)
 Sergio Camargo (1994) 
 Jay Chapman (1994) 
 Oscar Cordon (1993) 
 Aidan Daniels (1998)
 Julian Dunn (2000) 
 Raheem Edwards (1995)
 Liam Fraser (1998) 
 Jordan Hamilton (1996)
 Doneil Henry (1993)
 Deandre Kerr (2002)
 Nicholas Lindsay (1992)
 Keith Makubuya (1993)
 Chris Mannella (1994) 
 Jahkeele Marshall-Rutty (2004)
 Hugo Mbongue (2004)
 Ashtone Morgan (1991)
 Jayden Nelson (2002)
 Noble Okello (2000)
 Luca Petrasso (2000)
 Jordan Perruzza (2002)
 Ralph Priso (2002)
 Quillan Roberts (1994)
 Rocco Romeo (2000)
 Amadou Sanyang (1991)
 Jacob Shaffelburg (1999)
 Luke Singh (2000)
 Matt Stinson (1992)
 Kosi Thompson (2003)

The following players have appeared for the Toronto FC first team on short-term loan contracts for MLS or Canadian Championship matches (players in bold are currently Toronto FC II players), after having been a Toronto FC Academy player, but did not sign a full-time contract (as of May 7, 2022):

 Kobe Franklin (2003)
 Malik Johnson (1998)
 Allando Matheson (1992)
 Steffen Yeates (2000)

The following players signed homegrown player contracts with other teams in Major League Soccer, having had their rights traded by Toronto FC after previously being a Toronto FC Academy player (as of May 7, 2022):

 Josh Janniere (1992)

International matches
TFC Academy joined with Chile giants Colo-Colo. The Toronto FC Academy squad played their first game against opponents outside the Canadian Soccer League on Tuesday June 29, 2010. The Academy tied Colo-Colo 4–4. The U16 team competed Liga MX International tournament on August, 2017. Toronto FC III participated in the Dallas Cup 2018.

TFC Juniors 

The Toronto FC Juniors, also known as the TFC Juniors, is part of the youth academy and development system of Toronto FC. It is a curriculum based program, for players aged six to thirteen, specializing in grassroots development with a professional coaching staff.  The program holds camps regionally and has held camps in Toronto, Pickering, Vaughan, Stoney Creek in Hamilton, Oakville, and Markham. The Toronto FC Juniors program is one of Toronto FC Academy's main sources for prospects alongside their network of scouts.

Regional partners

In 2015, Toronto FC formed a partnership with the Ontario Soccer Association, with the OSA recognizing TFC as the top of the pyramid in Ontario with respect to the player pathway for elite men's soccer. Following this, TFC began to form regional partnerships with various youth clubs.

TFC Academy has made regional partnerships with local youth clubs in other Ontario cities re-branding under the TFC name - Windsor TFC, London TFC, and Ottawa TFC. Windsor TFC was the re-branded name from Windsor Stars SC, whose senior team plays in League1 Ontario.; London TFC was re-branded from FC London, whose senior team retained their name in L1O; Ottawa TFC was formed from a merger of Cumberland United SC and Capital United SC.

In 2021, the club announced three new regional partners: Kitchener TFC, Hamilton TFC, and DeRo TFC. Kitchener TFC rebranded from Kitchener SC, Hamilton TFC rebranded from Mount Hamilton Youth SC (Mount Hamilton is also part of the Hamilton United group that competes in League1 Ontario and DeRo TFC rebranded from DeRo United Futbol Academy.

See also
 Toronto FC II

References

External links

 

Canadian reserve soccer teams
Maple Leaf Sports & Entertainment
Academy
Association football clubs established in 2008
2008 establishments in Ontario
Soccer clubs in Toronto
League1 Ontario teams